The Port Vila Shield is an association football competition held for football clubs in the country of Vanuatu. It was founded in 2013 and is run by the Port Vila Football Association. The shield acts as a pre-season competition, where TVL Premier League clubs play against each other in a cup format.

Winners 

 2013 - Tafea FC
 2014 - Tafea FC
 2015 - Amicale FC

See also

 VFF National Super League
 Sport in Vanuatu

References 

 

1